Masters cycling is an age category of cycling officially established by the Union Cycliste Internationale (UCI) in 1994.

Competitions
 World Masters Track Cycling Championships organized since 1997.
 European Masters Cycling Championships

See also
 Senior sport
 History of the bicycle

References

External links
 

 
Cycling